Earthing may refer to:
 Ground (electricity) in electrical engineering
 Earthing system, how to connect an electrical circuit to ground
 , an alternative medicine practice
 Nature therapy, another alternative medicine practice
 Hilling, piling soil around the base of a plant